Challuma (possibly from Aymara ch'alla sand, uma water, "sand water") is a  mountain in the Andes of southern Peru near a lake of the same name. It is situated in the Moquegua Region, Mariscal Nieto Province, Carumas District, and in the Tacna Region, Candarave Province, Candarave District. It lies northeast of the mountain Churilaca.

Challuma is also the name of the valley on the south side of the mountain.

References

Mountains of Peru
Mountains of Moquegua Region
Mountains of Tacna Region
Lakes of Tacna Region
Lakes of Peru